Latin Soul is a live album by Poncho Sanchez, released through Concord Jazz in 1999. In 2000, the album won Sanchez the Grammy Award for Best Latin Jazz Performance.

Track listing

Personnel
Ramon Banda - shekere, timbales
Tony Banda - bass, shekere, vocals
John Burk - mixing, producer
Sal Cracchiolo - flugelhorn, trumpet
Ron Davis - mastering, mixing
Scott Martin - flute, sax
Poncho Sanchez - congas, mixing, percussion, timbales, vocals
David Torres - mixing, piano
Francisco Torres - trombone
Mike Whitman - baritone sax

References

1999 live albums
Poncho Sanchez albums
Grammy Award for Best Latin Jazz Album